German Battle may refer to:

 Franco-Prussian War 1870/71 that led to the establishment of the German Empire
 Siege of Yorktown, a 1781 battle in North America